The union of Bukovina with Romania was declared in 28 November 1918, being officially recognized by the international community in 1919 and 1920.

Timeline of events

1918
22 October - Constantin Isopescu-Grecul, a Bukovinian Romanian deputy in the Austrian Imperial Council, warns the authorities in Vienna that if they do not force Budapest to release Transylvania and other Romanian-inhabited areas from Hungary, then the Romanian subjects of the empire would have to look for outside help.
25 October - The Ukrainian National Committee for Bukovina is formed.
27 October - The Romanian National Council is formed under the leadership of Iancu Flondor. 
3 November - The Ukrainian National Rada takes control of the state apparatus in Czernowitz and the surrounding area.
4 November - Aurel Onciul, a Romanian Bukovinian politician, concludes an agreement (not authorized by the Romanian National Council) with the Ukrainian National Committee providing for the division of Bukovina along ethnic lines and joint Romanian-Ukrainian control over Czernowitz (the capital of Bukovina).
6 November - The Ukrainian National Committee occupies all Government buildings in Czernowitz and Omelian Popowicz is proclaimed President of "Ukrainian Bukovina".
7 November - Iancu Flondor appeals to the Romanian Government to occupy the entire land of Bukovina.  
9/10 November - Romania re-declares war on the Central Powers (the May 1918 Treaty of Bucharest put an end to the first Romanian Campaign).  
10 November - The Ukrainian National Committee together with its military supporters retreat from Czernowitz. 
11 November - Czernowitz (claimed by the West Ukrainian People's Republic) is seized by the Romanian Army. 
12 November - The Romanian National Council establishes a new government in Bukovina under Flondor's presidency.   
28 November - The Romanian National Council, together with Polish and German representatives, convokes the General Congress of Bukovina which requests the union of Bukovina with Romania.
19 December - The Romanian Government issues a decree formalizing Bukovina's annexation.

1919
10 September - The Treaty of Saint-Germain-en-Laye is signed, recognizing Romanian sovereignty over Bukovina (the frontiers of Romania were to be later fixed).

1920
10 August - The Treaty of Sèvres established the Romanian-Polish boundary (mainly, based on the July 1919 Lwów Convention).

Aftermath
Since 2015, the Bukovina Day is celebrated in Romania every 28 November to commemorate the union of the region with Romania.

Gallery

See also 
 Great Union
 Union of Transylvania with Romania
 Union of Bessarabia with Romania
 Greater Romania
 Romanian occupation of Pokuttia
 Soviet occupation of Bessarabia and Northern Bukovina

References

External links 

 Virtual Museum of the Union

1918 in Romania
Great Union (Romania)
Greater Romania
Romania
Territorial evolution of Romania
Aftermath of World War I in Romania